Jatov is a village and municipality in the Nové Zámky District in the Nitra Region of south-west Slovakia.

History
The municipality and village is a recent establishment built in 1952.

Geography
The village lies att an altitude of 116 metres and covers an area of 18.657 km². It has a population of about 784 people.

Ethnicity
The population is 100% Slovak.

Facilities
The village has a public library a football pitch and a gym.

Genealogical resources

The records for genealogical research are available at the state archive "Statny Archiv in Nitra, Slovakia"

 Roman Catholic church records (births/marriages/deaths): 1761-1896 (parish B)
 Lutheran church records (births/marriages/deaths): 1887-1954 (parish B)
 Reformated church records (births/marriages/deaths): 1806-1895 (parish B)

See also
 List of municipalities and towns in Slovakia

External links
https://web.archive.org/web/20070513023228/http://www.statistics.sk/mosmis/eng/run.html
Jatov – Nové Zámky Okolie
Surnames of living people in Jatov

Villages and municipalities in Nové Zámky District